The Higher Tour is the ongoing seventh concert tour by Canadian singer Michael Bublé, in support of his eleventh studio album, Higher (2022). The tour began on August 8, 2022 in Duluth and is scheduled to conclude in Auckland on June 25, 2023.

Set list

 "Feeling Good"
 "Haven't Met You Yet"
 "L-O-V-E"
 "Such a Night"
 "Sway"
 "When You're Smiling (The Whole World Smiles With You)"
 "Home"
 "Everything"
 "Higher"
 "To Love Somebody"
 "Hold On"
 "Smile"
 "I'll Never Not Love You"
 "Fever"
 "One Night"
 "All Shook Up"
 "Can't Help Falling in Love"
 "You're the First, the Last, My Everything"
 "It's a Beautiful Day"
 "Bring It On Home to Me”
Encore 
 "Save the Last Dance for Me"
 "How Sweet It Is (To Be Loved by You)"
 "Cry Me a River"
 "Always On My Mind"

Tour dates

Cancelled shows

Notes

References

Michael Bublé concert tours
2022 concert tours
2023 concert tours